Jamie Renée Smith (born April 10, 1987) is an American actress best known for her respective roles as Tara Westover, Margaret Rhodes and Lauren Wando in the films MVP: Most Valuable Primate, Children of the Corn IV: The Gathering (1996) and Dante's Peak (1997).

Life and career
Smith began her acting career in the fall of 1993 at the age of six when, at her first audition, she landed a guest-starring role on an episode of Saved by the Bell: The College Years ("Teacher's Pet") as Abby Lasky. In addition to her roles in Children of the Corn IV: The Gathering and Dante's Peak, Smith has appeared in other various television and films including Midnight Man, the ABC TV movie My Last Love (1999), the film MVP: Most Valuable Primate (2000), ER, Grounded for Life, Malcolm in the Middle, Shark, Bones, Criminal Minds: Suspect Behavior and NCIS. She also had three-episode stints on The Nanny and Weeds. In 1998, at the age of 10, Smith was a series regular on the Fox sitcom Ask Harriet as Blair Code; the series was canceled after five episodes aired.

Partial filmography

Awards and nominations

References

External links
 

1987 births
Living people
20th-century American actresses
21st-century American actresses
Actresses from New York City
American child actresses
American film actresses
American television actresses
People from Manhattan